Pinguin may refer to:
Bromelia pinguin, an edible plant
Fischtown Pinguins, a German ice hockey team
German auxiliary cruiser Pinguin, a World War II naval ship
Memín Pinguín, a fictional comic book character

See also
Penguin (disambiguation)